Mahinur Qasim (August15, 1929February28, 2021), also spelled Maynor Kasim and Mah-e-Noor Qasim, was a Uyghur political leader in Xinjiang, China and the widow of Ehmetjan Qasimi, a prominent Xinjiang revolutionary leader.

Early life
Mahinur Qasim, born in 1929, was a native of Korgas County in Ili. Some sources indicate her birthplace as the Panfilov District in the Soviet Union, while others say she was born in Korgas.  Her mother died when she was one year old and she worked as a child instead of attending school.  She married Ehmetjan Qasimi, a leader of the Second East Turkestan Republic (ETR), in Yining on January 15, 1945 and became his secretary.  The couple had a son and a daughter.  In 1948, after the ETR leadership agreed with the Nationalist Chinese government to form a coalition government in Xinjiang, Mahinur Qasim became a standing committee member of the Women's Committee of the Union to Protect Peace and Democracy in Xinjiang.  After her husband died on August 27, 1949 in an airplane crash in the Soviet Union en route to Beijing to attend the founding of the People's Republic of China, Mahinur Qasim remained active in public life.

Public service
In 1951, she became the deputy director of the Women's Federation in the Ili Special Direct.  In 1952, she became the mayor of Yining and joined the Chinese Communist Party.  In 1953, she became the deputy director of the General Office of the Xinjiang Provincial Government and the director of the Women's Federation in Xinjiang.  She was a delegate to the Second Chinese People's Political Consultative Conference, elected in 1954, and the 
Second and Third National People's Congress, elected in 1959 and 1964.

She was purged and persecuted during the Cultural Revolution and then rehabilitated thereafter.  In the 1980s and 1990s, she served as a vice chair of the 4th, 5th, 6th and 7th All-China Women's Federation, and was elected to the Standing Committee of the Seventh National People's Congress in 1988.  She has been a prominent advocate of women and children's rights.  She retired in 2003 and has continued to speak at women's rights events.

Memoirs
Her memoir of her husband, Remembering Ehmetijan 《回忆阿合买提江》, was published in 2011.  A Pictoral Memoir of the Wife of Ehmetijan Qasimi, Leader of the Three Districts Revolution 《三区革命头号领导人阿合买提江夫人的回忆图册》 was published in October 2002.

References

1929 births
Uyghur people
Chinese Communist Party politicians from Xinjiang
People's Republic of China politicians from Xinjiang
Political office-holders in Xinjiang
2021 deaths
People from Ili
Victims of the Cultural Revolution
All-China Women's Federation people